The president of the National Assembly of the Democratic Republic of the Congo is the presiding officer in the National Assembly.

Below is a list of presidents of the Chamber of Representatives:

Below is a list of presidents of the Legislative Council:

Below is a list of presidents of the High Council of the Republic:

Below is a list of presidents of the National Assembly:

Below is a list of presidents of the High Council of the Republic - Transitional Parliament:

Below is a list of presidents of the Constituent and Legislative Assembly - Transitional Parliament:

Below is a list of presidents of the National Assembly:

Citations

References 
 

Politics of the Democratic Republic of the Congo
 
Democratic Republic of the Congo, National Assembly